District 11 is the most northern and the most populous district in the Swiss city of Zürich.

The district comprises the quarters Affoltern, Oerlikon and Seebach. All three were formerly municipalities in their own right, but were incorporated into Zürich in 1934.

References

 
11